Neuromuscular blocking agents, or in abbreviation, NMBAs, are chemical agents that paralyse skeletal muscles by blocking the movement of neurotransmitter at the neuromuscular junction. They are often used during general anesthesia to optimize intubating and surgical  conditions, specifically to facilitate endotracheal intubation. This  class  of  medications  helps  to  reduce  patient  movement,  breathing,  or  ventilator  dyssynchrony  and  allows  lower  insufflation  pressures  during  laparoscopy including the generation of nerve impulses. It has several indications for use in the intense care unit.  It can help reduce hoarseness in voice as well as injury to the vocal cord during intubation. In addition, it plays an important role in facilitating mechanical ventilation in patients with poor lung function. In the following section, neuromuscular blocking agent's history, usages, mechanisms, side effects, interactions and pharmacology will further be elaborated and discussed.

History

Early discoveries, milestones, and development 

In South America in the 16th century, native people extracted curare, a crude extract, from plants primarily Chondrodendron species of the family Menispermaceae and Strychnos species of the family Loganiaceae.

Edward Bancroft, a chemist and physician in the 16th century brought samples of crude curare from South America back to the Old-World. The effect of curare was experimented with by Sir Benjamin Brodie when he injected small animals with curare, and found that the animals stopped breathing but could be kept alive by inflating their lungs with bellows. This observation led to the conclusion that curare can paralyse the respiratory muscles. It was also experimented by Charles Waterton in 1814 when he injected three donkeys with curare. The first donkey was injected in the shoulder and died afterward. The second donkey had a tourniquet applied to the foreleg and was injected distal to the tourniquet. The donkey lived while the tourniquet was in place but died after it was removed. The third donkey after injected with curare appeared to be dead but was resuscitated using bellows. Charles Waterton's experiment confirmed the paralytic effect of curare.

Another milestone in the development of NMBA was done by French Physiologist Claude Bernard when he injected curare into frog legs, the muscle in the leg would not contract when the nerve was directly stimulated but would contract when the muscle was directly stimulated. This shows that curare acts on the neuromuscular junction.

Neurologist Walter Freeman learned about curare and suggested to Richard Gill, a patient suffering from multiple sclerosis, that he try using it. Gill brought 25 pounds of raw curare from Ecuador. The raw curare was then given to Squibb and Sons to derive an effective antidote to curare. In 1942, Wintersteiner and Dutcher (two scientists working for Squibb and Sons) isolated the alkaloid d-tubocurarine. Soon after, they developed a preparation of curare called Intocostrin.

At the same time in Montreal, Harold Randall Griffith and his resident Enid Johnson at the Homeopathic Hospital administered curare to a young patient undergoing appendectomy. This was the first use of NMBA as muscle relaxant in anesthesia.

The 1940s, 1950s and 1960s saw the rapid development of several synthetic NMBA. Gallamine was the first synthetic NMBA used clinically. Scientists later developed atracurium, vecurnoium, rocuronium, suxamethonium and pancuronium.

Outdated treatment 

Gallamine triethiodide is originally developed for preventing muscle contractions during surgical procedures. However, it is no longer marketed in the United States according to the FDA orange book.

Medical Usage

Endotracheal intubation 
Administration of neuromuscular blocking agents (NMBA) during anesthesia can facilitate endotracheal intubation. This can decrease the incidence of postintubation hoarseness and airway injury.

Short-acting neuromuscular blocking agents are chosen for endotracheal intubation for short procedures (< 30minutes), and neuromonitoring is required soon after intubation. Options include succinylcholine, rocuronium or vecuronium if sugammadex is available for rapid reversal block.

Any short or intermediate acting depolarizing neuromuscular blocking agents can be applied for endotracheal intubation for long procedures (≥ 30 minutes). Options include succinylcholine, rocuronium, vecuronium, mivacurium, atracurium and cisatracurium. The choice among these NMBA depends on availability, cost and patient parameters that affect drug metabolism.

Intraoperative relaxation can be maintained as necessary with additional dose of nondepolarizing NMBA.

Among all NMBA, Succinylcholine establish the most stable and fastest intubating conditions, thus is considered as the preferred NMBA for rapid sequence induction and intubation (RSII). Alternatives for succinylcholine for RSII include high dose rocuronium (1.2mg/kg which is a 4 X ED95 dose), or avoidance of NMBAs with a high dose remifentanil intubation.

Facilitation of surgery 
Nondepolarizing NMBAs can be used to induce muscle relaxation that improves surgical conditions, including laparoscopic, robotic, abdominal and thoracic procedures. It can reduce patient movement, muscle tone, breathing or coughing against ventilator and allow lower insufflation pressure during laparoscopy. Administration of NMBAs should be individualized according to patient’s parameters. However, many operations can be performed without the need to apply any NMBAs as adequate anesthesia during surgery can achieve many of the theoretical benefits of neuromuscular blockage.

Mechanism

Depolarizing Neuromuscular blocking agent (Succinylcholine)

Phase I block (depolarizing) 
Succinylcholine interacts with nicotinic receptor to open the channel and cause depolarization of the end plate, which later spread to and result in depolarization of adjacent membranes. As a result, there is disorganisation of contraction of muscle motor unit. Later, since succinylcholine is not able to be metabolised and removed effectively at the synapse, the depolarized membranes remain in state of depolarisation and cannot respond to additional impulses. 
Phase I blok effect can be increased by cholinesterase inhibitors which further delay the action of metabolism and removal by cholinesterase.

Phase II block (desensitizing) 
Under continuous exposure to succinylcholine, the initial end plate depolarization is reduced, and repolarisation process is initiated. As a result of the widespread sustained depolarization the synapses ultimately begin repolarization. Once repolarized, the membrane’s is less susceptible to additional depolarization.

Nondepolarizing neuromuscular blocking agent 
In small clinical doses, nondepolarizing neuromuscular blocking agent act predominantly at the nicotinic receptor site to compete with acetylcholine.
In larger clinical dose, some of the blocking agent can access the pore of the ion channel and cause blockage. This weakens neuromuscular transmission and diminishes the effect of acetylcholinesterase inhibitors (e.g. neostigmine). Nondepolarizing NBAs may also block prejunctional sodium channels which interfere with the mobilization of acetylcholine at the nerve ending.

Side Effects 
The usage of succinylcholine, the depolarizing neuromuscular agent, can lead to hyperkalemia, malignant hyperthermia, myalgia, increased intragastric pressure, increased intraocular pressure, increased intracranial pressure, cardiac dysrhythmias (bradycardia is the most common type) and allergic reactions. As a result, it is contraindicated for patients with susceptibility to malignant hyperthermia, denervating conditions, major burns after 48 hours, and severe hyperkalemia.

For nondepolarizing NMBAs except vecuronium, pipecuronium, doxacurium, cisatracurium, rocuronium and rapacuronium, they produce certain extent of cardiovascular effect. Moreover, Tubocurarine can produce hypotension effect while Pancuronium can lead to moderate increase in heart rate and small increase in cardiac output with little or no increase in systemic vascular resistance, which is unique in nondeploarizing NMBAs.

Interactions 

Some drugs enhance or inhibit the response to NMBAs which require the dosage adjustment guided by monitoring.

Combination of NMBAs

In some clinical circumstances, succinylcholine may be administered before and after a nondepolarising NMBA or two different nondepolarising NMBAs are administered in sequence. Combining different NMBAs can result in different degrees of neuromuscular block and management should be guided with the use of a neuromuscular function monitor.

The administration of nondepolarising neuromuscular blocking agent has an antagonistic effect on the subsequent depolarising block induced by succinylcholine. If a nondepolarising NMBA is administered prior to succinycholine, the dose of succinylcholine must be increased.

The administration of succinylcholine on the subsequent administration of a nondepolarising neuromuscular block depends on the drug used. Studies have shown that administration of succinylcholien before a nondepolarising NMBA does not affect the potency of mivacurium or rocuronium. But for vecuronium and cisatracurium, it speeds up the onset, increases the potency and prolongs the duration of action.

Combining two nondepolarising NMBAs of the same chemical class (e.g. rocuronium and vecuronium) produces an additive effect, while combining two nondepolarising NMBAs of different chemical class (e.g. rocuronium and cisatracurium) produces a synergistic response.

Inhaled anesthetics

Inhaled anesthetics inhibit nicotinic acetylcholine receptors (nAChRs) and potentiate neuromuscular blockage with nondepolarising NMBAs. It depends on the type of volatile anesthetic (desflurane > sevoflurane > isoflurane > nitrous oxide), the concentration and the duration of exposure.

Antibiotics

Tetracycline, aminoglycosides, polymyxins and clindamycin potentiate neuromuscular blockage by inhibiting ACh release or desensitisation of post-synpatic nAChRs to ACh. This interaction happens mostly during maintenance of anesthesia. As antibiotics typically are given after a dose of NMBA, this interaction needs to be considered when re-dosing NMBA.

Anti-seizure drugs

Patients receiving chronic treatment are relatively resistance to nondepolarising NMBAs due to the accelerated clearance.

Lithium

Lithium is structurally similar to other cations such as sodium, potassium, magnesium and calcium, this causes lithium to activate potassium channels which inhibit neuromuscular transmission. Patients who take lithium can have a prolonged response to both depolarising and nondepolarising NMBAs.

Antidepressants

Sertraline and amitriptyline inhibit butyrylcholinesterase and cause prolonged paralysis. Mivacurium causes prolonged paralysis for patients chronically taking sertraline.

Local anesthetics (LAs)

LAs may enhance the effects of depolarisation and nondepolarising NMBAs through pre and post-synaptic interactions at the NMJ. It may result in blood levels high enough to potentiate NMBA-induced neuromuscular block. Epidurally administered levobupivacaine and mepivacaine potentiate amino-steroidal NMBAs and delay recovery from neuromuscular blockade.

Pharmacology

Physiology at the Neuromuscular Junction 

Neuromuscular blocking agents exert its effect by modulating the signal transmission in skeletal muscles. An action potential is, in other words, a depolarisation in neurone membrane due to a change in membrane potential greater than the threshold potential leads to an electrical impulse generation. The electrical impulse travels along the pre-synaptic neurone axon to synapse with the muscle at the neuromuscular junction (NMJ) to cause muscle contraction.

When the action potential reaches the axon terminal, it triggers the opening of the calcium ion gated channels, which causes the influx of Ca2+. Ca2+ will stimulate the release of neurotransmitter in the neurotransmitter containing vesicles by exocytosis (vesicle fuses with the pre-synpatic membrane).

The neurotransmitter, acetylcholine(ACh) binds to the nicotinic receptors on the motor end plate, which is a specialised area of the muscle fibre's post-synaptic membrane. This binding causes the nicotinic receptor channels to open and allow the influx of Na+ into the muscle fibre.

Fifty percent of the released ACh is hydrolysed by acetylcholinesterase (AChE) and the remaining bind to the nicotinic receptors on the motor end plate. When ACh is degraded by AChE, the receptors are no longer stimulated and the muscle can be repolarised.

If enough Na+ enter the muscle fibre, it causes an increase in the membrane potential from its resting potential of -95mV to -50mV (above the threshold potential -55V) which causes an action potential to spread throughout the fibre. This potential travels along the surface of the sarcolemma. The sarcolemma is an excitable membrane that surrounds the contractile structures known as myofibrils that are located deep in the muscle fibre. For the action potential to reach the myofibrils, the action potential travels along the transverse tubules (T-tubules) that connects the sarcolemma and center of the fibre.

Later, action potential reaches the sarcoplasmic reticulum which stores the Ca2+  needed for muscle contraction and causes Ca2+ to be released from the sarcoplasmic reticulum.

Pharmacological of depolarising NMBA

Pharmacology of Succinycholine
(only depolarising NMBA available for clinical use)

Succinycholine (aka diacetylcholine or suxamethonium chloride) has the fastest onset and shortest duration of all NMBAs. It is indicated for rapid sequence intubation. It is administered intravenously. Within 30 seconds, the patient will experience fasciculation due to the depolarisation of muscle neurone fibres and seconds later, flaccid paralysis will occur.

Dosing/onset of action 

IV dose 1-1.5mg/kg or 3 to 5 x ED95

Paralysis occurs in one to two minutes.

Clinical duration of action (time from drug administration to recovery of single twich to 25% of baseline) is 7-12 minutes.

If IV access is unavailable, intramuscular administration 3-4mg/kg. Paralysis occurs at 4 minutes.

Use of succinylcholine infusion or repeated bolus administration increase the risk of Phase II block and prolonged paralysis. Phase II block occurs after large doses (>4mg/kg). This occurs when the post-synaptic membrane action potential returns to baseline in spite of the presence of succinylcholine and causes continued activation of nicotinic acetylcholine receptors.

Pharmacokinetics 

Succinylcholine is metabolised by butyrylcholinesterase (aka pseudocholinesterase or plasma cholinesterase).

Adverse effects of succinylcholine 

Contraindications: malignant hyperthermia, denervating conditions, major burns after 48 hours and severe hyperkalemia

Hyperkalemia, malignant hyperthermia, myalgias, increased intragastric pressure, increased intraocular pressure, increased intracranial pressure, cardiac dysrhythmias and allergic reactions

Pharmacology of nondepolarising neuromuscular blocking agents 

The speed of onset depends on the potency of the drug, greater potency is associated with slower onset of block. Rocuronium, with an ED95 of 0.3 mg/kg IV has a more rapid onset than Vecuronium with an ED95 of 0.05mg/kg.

Steroidal compounds

Steroidal compounds - Rocuronium and vecuronium are intermediate-acting drugs while Pancuronium and pipecuronium are long-acting drugs.

References 

Muscular system
Neurochemistry